Yambio is a City in South Sudan.

Location
The City is located in Yambio County, Western Equatoria State, in southwestern South Sudan, close to the border with the Democratic Republic of Congo.

Overview
Yambio is the headquarters of Yambio County, in which it lies. It is also the largest City of Western Equatoria State, one of the 10 states that constitute the Republic of South Sudan. Following the attainment of independence by South Sudan in 2011, the main current concerns in Yambio include the following:

 Resettlement of new South Sudanese returnees especially from the Republic of Sudan, but also from other countries such as the Democratic Republic of the Congo, the Central African Republic, and Uganda.
 Security enhancement against the marauding Ugandan rebels known as the Lord's Resistance Army (LRA), who have terrorized the region for the past decade or so.
 Ensuring that the old residents and new returnees have enough food, now and in the future.

Population and demographics
Yambio and the surrounding communities are the ancestral home of the Azande ethnic group, who also inhabit in neighboring countries of The Democratic Republic of the Congo and The Central African Republic. Apart from the Azande other tribes that stays in Yambio county include the balanda, Mundu and some few morokodo.

In 1983, the population of Yambio was estimated at approximately 24,900, during the Sudanese national census conducted that year. In 2010, it was estimated that the town's population had risen to about 31,700 people. In 2011, another source estimated the population of the town at about 45,400.
The table below summarizes the population trends of the town, from all sources, for the last thirty (30) years. See table below:

Transportation
The main major High-way that passes through The City of Yambio is High-way A44-NW northbound to Town of Ri Rangu, while A44-W leads to Nzara and to the Town of Ezo at the border with the Central African Republic and to the Town of Tambura. Highway A44-E joins Highway A43 which goes east to Town of Maridi and far east to the South Sudan's Capital City Juba. High-way A44SE branch off at A44-East in Maridi, and goes southeast to Yei Town in Central Equatoria State. High-way A44-S goes to boarder Town of Nabiapai at the boarder of The Democratic Republic of the Congo and The Republic South Sudan. Yambio is also served by Yambio Airport (HSYA).

Points of interest
The following points of interest are located in Yambio or near the city limits:

 The offices of Yambio City Council
 The headquarters of Yambio County
 The headquarters of Western Equatoria State
 Yambio Airport - Civil Airport
 Royal Palace of the Azande Kingdom
 A branch of Equity Bank (South Sudan) - A licensed commercial bank
 A branch of KCB bank Kenyan commercial bank a registered commercial branch in Yambio
 The grave of King Gdudwe.
 All saints cathedral Timbiro.
 Gbudwe football stadium.

See also
Yambio Airport
EPA
Central Equatoria
Eastern Equatoria
Western Equatoria
Equatoria

References

External links
 Administrative Map of Sudan & South Sudan

Populated places in Western Equatoria
State capitals in South Sudan